A massacre is the killing of a large number of people, especially those who are not involved in any fighting or have no way of defending themselves. A massacre is generally considered to be morally unacceptable, especially when perpetrated by a group of political actors against defenseless victims. The word is a loan of a French term for "butchery" or "carnage". A "massacre" is not necessarily a "crime against humanity". Other terms with overlapping scope include war crime, pogrom, mass killing, mass murder, and extrajudicial killing.

Etymology 

The modern definition of massacre as "indiscriminate slaughter, carnage", and the subsequent verb of this form, derive from late 16th century Middle French, evolved from Middle French "macacre, macecle" meaning "slaughterhouse, butchery". Further origins are dubious, though may be related to Latin macellum "provisions store, butcher shop".

The Middle French word macecr "butchery, carnage" is first recorded in the late 11th century. Its primary use remained the context of animal slaughter (in hunting terminology referring to the head of a stag) well into the 18th century.
The use of macecre "butchery" of the mass killing of people dates to the 12th century, implying people being "slaughtered like animals".
The term did not necessarily imply a multitude of victims, e.g. Fénelon in Dialogue des Morts (1712) uses l'horride massacre de Blois ("the horrid massacre at [the chateau of] Blois") of the assassination of Henry I, Duke of Guise (1588), while Boileau, Satires XI (1698) has L'Europe fut un champ de massacre et d'horreur "Europe was a field of massacre and horror" of the European wars of religion.

The French word was loaned into English in the 1580s, specifically in the sense "indiscriminate slaughter of a large number of people".
It is used in reference to St. Bartholomew's Day massacre in The Massacre at Paris by Christopher Marlowe. The term is again used  in 1695 for the Sicilian Vespers of 1281, called "that famous Massacre of the French in Sicily" in the English translation of  De quattuor monarchiis by Johannes Sleidanus (1556),
translating illa memorabilis Gallorum clades per Siciliam, i.e. massacre is here used as the translation of Latin clades "hammering, breaking; destruction".
The term's use in historiography was popularized by Gibbon's History of the Decline and Fall of the Roman Empire (1781–1789), who used e.g. "massacre of the Latins" of the killing of Roman Catholics in Constantinople in 1182. The Åbo Bloodbath has also been described as a kind of massacre, which was a mass punishment carried out on the Old Great Square in Turku on November 10, 1599, in which 14 opponents of the Duke Charles (later King Charles IX) in Finland were decapitated; in the Battle between Duke Charles and Sigismund, Duke Charles defeated King Sigismund's troops in the Battle of Stångebro in Sweden in 1598 and then made an expedition to Finland, where he defeated the resistance during the Cudgel War and executed the estates in Turku without consulting Finland's leading nobles.

An early use in the propagandistic portrayal of current events was the "Boston Massacre" of 1770, which was employed to build support for the American Revolution. A pamphlet with the title A short narrative of the horrid massacre in Boston, perpetrated in the evening of the fifth day of March, 1770, by soldiers of the 29th regiment was printed in Boston still in 1770.

The term massacre began to see inflationary use in journalism first half of the 20th century. By the 1970s, it could also be used purely metaphorically, 
of events that do not involve deaths, such as the Saturday Night Massacre—the dismissals and resignations of political appointees during Richard Nixon's Watergate scandal.

Definitions 

The term massacre, being a synonym of "butchery, carnage", is by nature hyperbolic or subjective, primarily used in partisan descriptions of events. 

Robert Melson (1982) in the context of the "Hamidian massacres" used a "basic working definition" of "by massacre we shall mean the intentional killing by political actors of a significant number of relatively defenseless people... the motives for massacre need not be rational in order for the killings to be intentional... Mass killings can be carried out for various reasons, including a response to false rumors... political massacre... should be distinguished from criminal or pathological mass killings... as political bodies we of course include the state and its agencies, but also nonstate actors..."

Similarly, Levene (1999) attempts an objective classification of "massacres" throughout history, taking the term to refer to killings carried out by groups using overwhelming force against defenseless victims. He is excepting certain cases of mass executions, requiring that massacres  must have the quality of being morally unacceptable.

The term "fractal massacre" has been given to two different phenomena, the first being the fracturing of Aboriginal tribes by killing more than 30% of the tribe on one of their hunting missions, and the second being given to the phenomenon of many small killings adding up to a larger genocide.

See also 

 Democide
 Disaster
 Ethnic cleansing
 Genocide
 Killing spree
 List of events named massacres
Mass killing
 Mass murder
 Pogrom
 Tragedy
 Tragedy (event)
 War crime

References

Notes

Citations

Sources

Further reading

 
 

 

Killings by type